This is an alphabetically ordered list of sub-titles, nicknames and non-numeric titles that have been applied to classical music compositions of types that are normally identified only by some combination of number, key and catalogue number.  These types of compositions include: symphony, concerto, sonata, and standard chamber music combinations (string strio, quartet, quintet, sextet, etc.; piano trio, quartet, quintet, sextet, etc.), among others.

A sub-title is a subsidiary name given to a work by the composer, and considered part of its formal title, such as:
 The Age of Anxiety, the sub-title of Bernstein's Symphony No. 2
 Pathétique, the sub-title of Tchaikovsky's Symphony No. 6 in B minor, Op. 74.

A nickname is a name that is not part of the title given by the composer, but has come to be popularly associated with the work, such as: 
 Emperor, the nickname of Beethoven's Piano Concerto No. 5 in E-flat major, Op. 73
 Jupiter, the nickname of Mozart's Symphony No. 41 in C major, K. 551.

A non-numeric title is a formal title that departs from the usual sequential numbering of works of the same type, such as:
 Symphonie fantastique by Berlioz and
 Warsaw Concerto by Addinsell.

Background
Many classical compositions belong to a numbered series of works of a similar type by the same composer.  For example, Beethoven wrote 9 symphonies, 10 violin sonatas, 32 piano sonatas, 5 piano concertos, 16 string quartets, 7 piano trios and other works, all of which are numbered sequentially within their genres and generally referred to by their sequence numbers, keys and opus numbers.  For example, the 6th of his violin sonatas is referred to as: Violin Sonata No. 6 in A major, Op. 30, No. 1.

However, some of these works were also given descriptive sub-titles by Beethoven himself: for example, he sub-titled the 3rd Symphony "Eroica", and the 6th Symphony "Pastoral".

Others were given nicknames by publishers or others: for example, the Piano Sonata No. 14 is called "Moonlight" and the Piano Trio No. 7 is known as the "Archduke".

In other cases, a composer gives a work a title without any number, even though he may have written other works of that type with numbers.  For example, Tchaikovsky wrote 6 numbered symphonies, but he also wrote the unnumbered Manfred Symphony between the 4th and 5th symphonies.  A listing of all Tchaikovsky's symphonies would be incomplete without mention of the Manfred Symphony.

Special cases
Works such as Vaughan Williams's first three symphonies (A Sea Symphony, A London Symphony and A Pastoral Symphony) fit into more than one camp.  These are true titles, as Vaughan Williams commenced the numbering of his symphonies only from his 4th Symphony.  The first three symphonies were, however, retrospectively given numbers by cataloguers.  Hence, A Sea Symphony, for example, is often referred to as his "Symphony No. 1", with the original title being relegated to a sub-title, although that was never Vaughan Williams's own intention or practice.

Other named works excluded
There are vast numbers of other named compositions that do not qualify for this list.  Symphonic poems, concert overtures, suites, variations, operas, ballets, most vocal and choral music, and miscellaneous other works are normally given titles that exclude numbers.  Examples of such works would include: 
 Thus Spoke Zarathustra, symphonic poem by Richard Strauss
 Tragic Overture by Brahms
 Schelomo, Hebraic rhapsody by Bloch
 The Planets, Suite by Holst
 Sea Pictures, song cycle by Elgar
 Messiah, oratorio by Handel
 La bohème, opera by Puccini
 Carnaval, a set of piano pieces by Schumann

List of sub-titles, nicknames and non-numeric titles

A
 A: Joseph Haydn, Symphony No. 107 in B-flat major, Hob. I/107
 Adagio: 
Karl Amadeus Hartmann, Symphony No. 2
Krzysztof Penderecki, Symphony No. 4
 Adélaïde: Marius Casadesus (attrib. Wolfgang Amadeus Mozart), Violin Concerto in D
 L'Adieu: Frédéric Chopin, Waltz No. 9 in A flat major, Op. posth. 69/1
 Adieu: the second of Karlheinz Stockhausen's three unnumbered wind quintets
 Aeolian Harp: Frédéric Chopin, Étude in A flat, Op. 25/1
 Afro-American: William Grant Still, Symphony No. 1
 Age of Anxiety: Leonard Bernstein, Symphony No. 2
 Agiochook: Alan Hovhaness, Symphony No. 64, Op. 422
 Air Russe: Franz Schubert, Moment musical No. 3 in F minor, D. 780/3
 Albinoni's Adagio: Remo Giazotto, Adagio in G minor
 All Men are Brothers: Alan Hovhaness, Symphony No. 11, Op. 186
 Alla Marcia: Boris Tishchenko, Concerto Alla Marcia for sixteen soloists
 Alla Veneziana: Arthur Butterworth, Trumpet Concerto, Op. 93
 L'Allegro ed il Penseroso: Charles Villiers Stanford, Symphony No. 5, Op. 56
 Alleluia: Joseph Haydn, Symphony No. 30 in C major, Hob. I/30
 Alpine: Richard Strauss, Symphony No. 4 in A major
 American:
 American Quartet – Antonín Dvořák, String Quartet No. 12 in F major, Op. 96
 American Quintet – Antonín Dvořák, String Quintet No. 3 in E-flat major, Op. 97
 American Suite  - Antonín Dvořák, Suite in A major, Op. 98b
 American Symphony, An - Don Gillis, Symphony No. 1
 Angel of Light: Einojuhani Rautavaara, Symphony No. 7
 Ani: Alan Hovhaness, Symphony No. 23, Op. 249
 Antar: Nikolai Rimsky-Korsakov, Symphony No. 2 (later renamed symphonic suite)
 Antarctic Symphony: Peter Maxwell Davies, Symphony No. 8: Antarctic Symphony
 Antartica: Ralph Vaughan Williams, Symphony No. 7 Sinfonia Antartica
 Antígona: Carlos Chávez, Symphony No. 1 Sinfonía de Antígona
 Antique:
 Friedrich Witt attrib., Symphonie antique
 Charles-Marie Widor, Symphonie Antique, Op. 83
 Antretter: Wolfgang Amadeus Mozart, Serenade No. 3 in D major, K. 185
 Apocalyptic: Anton Bruckner, Symphony No. 8 in C minor
 Appalachian Mountains, To the: Alan Hovhaness, Symphony No. 60, Op. 396
 Appassionata: Ludwig van Beethoven, Piano Sonata No. 23 in F minor, Op. 57
 Apponyi: Joseph Haydn, String Quartets, Opp. 71, 74
 Aquerò: Malcolm Williamson, Symphony No. 5
 Arabescata: Einojuhani Rautavaara, Symphony No. 4
 Ararat: Alan Hovhaness, Symphony No. 14, Op. 194
 Archduke: Ludwig van Beethoven, Piano Trio No. 7 in B-flat major, Op. 97
 Ardent Song: Alan Hovhaness, Symphony No. 13, Op. 190
 Arjuna: Alan Hovhaness, Symphony No. 8, Op. 179
 Arthurus Rex: William T. Blows, Symphony No. 10
 Artstakh: Alan Hovhaness, Symphony No. 65, Op. 427
 Ascension (Ascenção): Heitor Villa-Lobos, Symphony No. 2
 Atlantis: Jānis Ivanovs, Symphony No. 4
 Autumn (Efterår): Peter Lange-Müller, Symphony No. 1 in D minor, Op. 17
L'autunno: Antonio Vivaldi, from Le quattro stagioni, Violin Concerto RV 293, Op. 8 L'estro armonico third concerto (from The Four Seasons: The Autumn)
 Aviation: Nikolai Myaskovsky, Symphony No. 16 in F Major Op. 39

B
 B: Joseph Haydn, Symphony No. 108 in B-flat major, Hob. I/108
 Babi Yar: Dmitri Shostakovich, Symphony No. 13 in B-flat minor, Op. 113
 Battle (and variants):
 Wolfgang Amadeus Mozart, Contredanse in C, K. 535, La Bataille
 Ludwig van Beethoven, Battle Symphony
 Bear: Joseph Haydn, Symphony No. 82 in C major, Hob. I/82
 Bee's Wedding: Felix Mendelssohn, Song without Words in C major, Op. 67/4
 Beethoven's Tenth: Johannes Brahms, Symphony No. 1 in C minor, Op. 68
 Bell:
 Sergei Rachmaninoff, Choral Symphony The Bells, Op. 35
 Aram Khachaturian, Symphony No. 2, The Bell
 The Bells of Zlonice: Antonín Dvořák, Symphony No. 1 in C minor, Op. 3
 Big Apple: Johan de Meij, Symphony No. 2
 Bird Quartet:  Joseph Haydn, String Quartet, Opus 33 No. 3
 Black Key: Frédéric Chopin, Etude in G flat, Op. 10/5
 Black Mass: Alexander Scriabin, Piano Sonata No. 9, Op. 68
 Boreale: Vagn Holmboe, Symphony No. 8, Boreale, Sinfonia
 Borealis: Arthur Butterworth, Symphony No. 3, Op. 52, Sinfonia Borealis
 Boreas: David del Puerto, Symphony No. 1
 Brasília:
 César Guerra-Peixe, Symphony No. 2, Brasilia
 Cláudio Santoro, Symphony No. 7, Sinfonia Brasilia
 Breve/Brevis:
 Havergal Brian, Symphony No. 22, Symphonia Brevis
 Vincent d'Indy, Symphony No. 3, Sinfonia Brevis de bello Gallico
 Gösta Nystroem, Symphony No. 1, Sinfonia Breve
 Broken Wings: Alan Hovhaness, Symphony No. 32, Op. 296
 Butterfly: Frédéric Chopin, Etude in G flat, Op. 25/9

C
 Cambridge: Hubert Parry, Symphony No. 2
 The Camp Meeting: Charles Ives, Symphony No. 3
 Capricieuse: Franz Berwald, Symphony No. 2
 Cat's Fugue: Domenico Scarlatti, Keyboard Sonata in G minor, Kk. 30
 St Cecilia: George Frideric Handel, Concerto Grosso in D major, HWV 323, St Cecilia's Concerto
 Celestial Gate: Alan Hovhaness, Symphony No. 6, Op. 173
 Cévenole: Vincent d'Indy, Symphonie Cévenole ("Cévennes Symphony"), a.k.a. Symphonie sur un chant montagnard français ("Symphony on a French Mountain Air")
 La chasse: Joseph Haydn, Symphony No. 73 in D major, Hob. I/73
 Children in the Streets: Thomas Koppel, Symphony for Children in the Streets (Symfoni for gadens børn)
 Children's Games: Peter Maxwell Davies, Naxos String Quartet No. 4
 Choral:
 Ludwig van Beethoven, Symphony No. 9 in D minor, Op. 125
 Philip Glass, Symphony No. 5
 Alan Hovhaness, Symphony No. 12, Op. 188
 Chord: Frédéric Chopin, Prelude No. 20 in C minor, Op. 28/20
 Christmas:
 Alan Hovhaness, Symphony No. 49, Op. 356
 Krzysztof Penderecki, Symphony No. 2
 Circe: Alan Hovhaness, Symphony No. 18, Op. 204a
 City of Light: Alan Hovhaness, Symphony No. 22, Op. 236
 Classical: Sergei Prokofiev, Symphony No. 1 in D major, Op. 25
 Clock: Joseph Haydn, Symphony No. 101 in D major, Hob. I/101
 Cold Mountain: Alan Hovhaness, Symphony No. 57, Op. 381
 Colloredo: Wolfgang Amadeus Mozart, Serenade No. 4 in D major, K. 203
 Colour: Arthur Bliss, A Colour Symphony
 Comica: Felix Draeseke, Symphony No. 4 in E minor Symphonia Comica, WoO 38
 Concerto funebre: Karl Amadeus Hartmann, Concerto for violin and string orchestra 
 Concerto without Orchestra: Robert Schumann, Piano Sonata No. 3 in F minor, Op. 14
 Concord: Charles Ives, Piano Sonata No. 2
 Connecticut: Henry Kimball Hadley, Symphony No. 5 in C minor, Op. 140
 Copernican: Henryk Górecki, Symphony No. 2, Op. 31
 Coronation: Wolfgang Amadeus Mozart, Piano Concerto No. 26 in D major, K. 537
 Creation: William Wallace, Creation Symphony
 The Cuckoo and the Nightingale: George Frideric Handel, Organ Concerto in F, HWV 295
 Cuerdas: Carlos Chávez, Symphony No. 5, Sinfonía para cuerdas

D
 Dance: Don Gillis, Symphony No. 8, A Dance Symphony
 Dante: Franz Liszt, Symphony No. 2 in D minor (full name: A symphony to Dante's "Divina Commedia")
 Death and the Maiden: Franz Schubert, String Quartet No. 14 in D minor, D. 810
 Defiance: Leoš Janáček, Capriccio for piano left-hand and chamber ensemble
 Deidre: Rutland Boughton, Symphony No. 2 (1926-7)
 Deliciae basiliensis: Arthur Honegger, Symphony No. 4
 Deutsche: Hanns Eisler, Deutsche Sinfonie
 Deux mondes: Pierre Kaelin, Symphonie des deux mondes (Symphony of the Two Worlds)
 Devil's Trill: Giuseppe Tartini, Violin Sonata in G minor
 Di tre re: Arthur Honegger, Symphony No. 5
 Dissonance: Wolfgang Amadeus Mozart, String Quartet No. 19 in C major, K. 465
 Il distratto: Joseph Haydn, Symphony No. 60 in C major, Hob. I/60
 The Divine Poem: Alexander Scriabin, Symphony No. 3 in C minor, Op. 43
 Dollar: Kurt Atterberg, Symphony No. 6
 Domestica: Richard Strauss, Symphony No. 3 in D minor
 Donnerwetter: Wolfgang Amadeus Mozart, Contredanse in D, K. 534
 Dramatic: Anton Rubinstein, Symphony No. 4 in D minor, Op. 95
 Drum: Frédéric Chopin, Polonaise in A-flat major, Op. 53
 Drumroll: Joseph Haydn, Symphony No. 103 in E-flat major, Hob. I/103
 Duetto: Felix Mendelssohn, Song without Words in A-flat major, Op. 38/6
 Dumky: Antonín Dvořák, Piano Trio No. 4 in E minor, Op. 90

E
 Earthquake: Anatol Vieru: Symphony No. 3
 Echo: Joseph Haydn, Symphony No. 38
 Efterår (Autumn): Peter Lange-Müller, Symphony No. 1 in D minor, Op. 17
 Eine kleine Nachtmusik: Wolfgang Amadeus Mozart, Serenade No. 13 in G major, K. 525, Eine kleine Nachtmusik (A Little Night Music)
 Elegiac: Charles Villiers Stanford, Symphony No. 2 in D minor
 Elevamini: Malcolm Williamson, Symphony No. 1
 Elvira Madigan: Wolfgang Amadeus Mozart, Piano Concerto No. 21 in C major, K. 467
 Emerson: Charles Ives, Piano Sonata No. 2 (first draft as a concerto)
 Emperor: Ludwig van Beethoven, Piano Concerto No. 5 in E-flat major, Op. 73
 En la melancolía de tu recuerdo, Soria: David del Puerto, Symphony No. 3
 Energica: Jānis Ivanovs, Symphony No. 12 in C major, Sinfonia Energica
 English: Hubert Parry, Symphony No. 3
 Enigma: Edward Elgar, Enigma Variations, Op. 36 (Note: The formal title is Variations on an Original Theme for orchestra, with "Enigma" being a sub-title)
 Erdödy: Joseph Haydn, String Quartets, Op. 76
 Eroica: Ludwig van Beethoven, Symphony No. 3 in E-flat major, Op. 55
 Espagnole: Édouard Lalo, Symphonie espagnole in D minor, Op. 21 (actually a violin concerto)
 Espansiva: Carl Nielsen, Symphony No. 3, Sinfonia Espansiva, Op. 27
L'estate: Antonio Vivaldi, from Le quattro stagioni, Violin Concerto RV 315, Op. 8 L'estro armonico second concerto (from The Four Seasons: The summer)
 Etchmiadzin: Alan Hovhaness, Symphony No. 21, Op. 234
 Exile: Alan Hovhaness, Symphony No. 1, Op. 17/2
 Exodus: Anatol Vieru: Symphony No. 6

F
 Faith: Don Gillis, Symphony No. 2, Symphony of Faith
 Fantaisie: Franz Schubert, Piano Sonata No. 18 in G major, D. 894
 Fantaisies Symphoniques: Bohuslav Martinů, Symphony No. 6
 Fantastique: Hector Berlioz, Symphonie fantastique
 Farewell: Joseph Haydn, Symphony No. 45
 The Fate of a Man: Jivan Gurgeni Ter-T'at'evosian, Symphony No. 2, The Fate of a Man (Sud'ba cheloveka)
 Faust: Franz Liszt, Symphony No. 1 in C minor
 Feuer (Fire): Joseph Haydn, Symphony No. 59 in A major
 Fire (Feuer): Joseph Haydn, Symphony No. 59 in A major
 The First of May: Dmitri Shostakovich, Symphony No. 3 in E-flat, Op. 20
 Fishermen of Loch Neagh: Charles Villiers Stanford, Irish Rhapsody for orchestra No. 4 in A minor, Op. 141
 Folksong:
 Roy Harris, Symphony No. 4
 Felix Mendelssohn, Song without Words in A-flat major, Op. 53/5
 Fortieth: Wolfgang Amadeus Mozart, Symphony No. 40 in G minor, K. 550
 The Four Seasons: 
Antonio Vivaldi first four (violin) concertos from Op. 8 L'estro armonico
Henry Kimball Hadley, Symphony No. 2 in F minor, Op. 30, 1899
 The Four Temperaments: Carl Nielsen, Symphony No. 2, Op. 16
 Free Men: Don Gillis, Symphony No. 3, A Symphony for Free Men
 French: Boris Tishchenko, A French Symphony
 French Mountain Air: Vincent d'Indy, Symphonie Cévenole ("Cévennes Symphony"), a.k.a. Symphonie sur un chant montagnard français (Symphony on a French Mountain Air)
 From My Life: Bedřich Smetana, String Quartet No. 1 in E minor
 From the New World: Antonín Dvořák, Symphony No. 9 in E minor, Op. 95
 From the Street: Leoš Janáček, Piano Sonata (also known as 1. X. 1905)
 From the Welsh Hills: Rutland Boughton, String Quartet in G (1923)
 Fun: Don Gillis, Symphony No. 5½, A Symphony for Fun
 Funèbre et triomphale: Hector Berlioz, Grande symphonie funèbre et triomphale
 Funeral March:
 Frédéric Chopin, Piano Sonata No. 2 in B flat minor, Op. 35
 Felix Mendelssohn, Song without Words in E minor, Op. 62/3

G
 Gaelic: Amy Beach Symphony in E minor, Op. 32
 Il gardellino: Antonio Vivaldi Flute Concerto RV 428 (The Goldfinch);
 Gasteiner: Franz Schubert, Piano Sonata No. 17 in D major, D. 850
 Gettysburg: Roy Harris, Symphony No. 6
 Ghost: Ludwig van Beethoven, Piano Trios No. 5 in D major, Op. 70/1
 Gothic:
 Havergal Brian, Symphony No. 1 in D minor
 Charles-Marie Widor, Symphony for Organ No. 9
 Il Gran Mogul concerto Violin Concerto RV 431a (The Grand Moghul));
 Gran Partita: Wolfgang Amadeus Mozart, Serenade No. 10 in B-flat major, K. 361
 Grand Duo: Franz Schubert, Sonata in C major for piano 4-hands, D. 812
 Great C major: Franz Schubert, Symphony No. 9 in C major, D. 944
 Great G minor: Wolfgang Amadeus Mozart, Symphony No. 40 in G minor, K. 550
 Greek: Rutland Boughton, String Quartet in A (1923)
 Green Mountains, To the: Alan Hovhaness, Symphony No. 46, Op. 347
 A Guerra (The War): Heitor Villa-Lobos, Symphony No. 3

H
 Haffner:
 Wolfgang Amadeus Mozart:
 Serenade No. 7 in D major, K. 250
 Symphony No. 35 in D major, K. 385
 Hammerklavier: Ludwig van Beethoven, Piano Sonata No. 29 in B-flat major, Op. 106
 The Harmonious Blacksmith: George Frideric Handel, first movement of Suite No. 5 in E major, HWV 430
 Harold in Italy: Hector Berlioz, Harold en Italie (Symphony for viola and orchestra)
 Harp: Ludwig van Beethoven, String Quartet No. 10 in E-flat major, Op. 74
 Helicopter String Quartet: Karlheinz Stockhausen
 Hen: Joseph Haydn, Symphony No. 83 in G minor, Hob. I/83
 Heroes: Philip Glass, Symphony No. 4
 Heroic (see also Eroica):
 Frédéric Chopin, Polonaise in A-flat major, Op. 53
 Eduard Tubin, Symphony No. 3
 Héroïde-élégiaque: Franz Liszt, Hungarian Rhapsody No. 5, S. 244/5
 Hoffmeister: Wolfgang Amadeus Mozart, String Quartet No. 20 in D major, K. 499
 Hoffnung: a string trio by Karlheinz Stockhausen, the "ninth hour" of his Klang cycle
 Holidays: Charles Ives, Holidays Symphony (A Symphony:  New England Holidays)
 Hornsignal: Joseph Haydn, Symphony No. 31 in D major
 Humana: Jānis Ivanovs, Symphony No. 13, Symphonia Humana
 Hunt: 
 Wolfgang Amadeus Mozart, String Quartet No. 17 in B-flat major, K. 458
 Wolfgang Amadeus Mozart, Piano Sonata No. 18 in D major, K. 576
 Ludwig van Beethoven, Piano Sonata No. 18 in E-flat major, Op. 31, No. 3
 Hunting Song: Felix Mendelssohn, Song without Words in A major, Op. 19/3
 Hydriotaphia: William Alwyn, Symphony No. 5
 Hymn to Glacier Peak: Alan Hovhaness, Symphony No. 66, Op. 428
 Hymn to the Mountains: Alan Hovhaness, Symphony No. 67, Op. 429
 Hymn of Praise (Lobgesang): Felix Mendelssohn (posthumously named Symphony No. 2 in B-flat major), Op. 52

I
 The Icy Mirror: Malcolm Williamson, Symphony No. 3
 L'impériale: Joseph Haydn, Symphony No. 53 in D major, Hob. I/53
 O Imprevisto (The Unforeseen): Heitor Villa-Lobos, Symphony No. 1
 In Memoriam:
 In Memoriam - Don Gillis, Symphony No. 5
 In Memoriam - Arthur Sullivan, Overture in C, "In Memoriam"
 In Memoriam G. F. Watts - Charles Villiers Stanford, Symphony No. 6 in E-flat major, Op. 94
 In nomine Domini: Joseph Haydn, Symphony No. 84 in E-flat major, Hob. I/84
 In the Steppes of Central Asia: Alexander Borodin, Musical Picture: In Central Asia
 India: Carlos Chávez, Symphony No. 2, Sinfonia india
 Inextinguishable: Carl Nielsen, Symphony No. 4, Op. 29
 Intimate Letters: Leoš Janáček, String Quartet No. 2
L'inverno: Antonio Vivaldi, from Le quattro stagioni, Violin Concerto RV 297, Op. 8 L'estro armonico fourth concerto (from The Four Seasons: The Winter)
 Ipsa: Jānis Ivanovs, Symphony No. 15, Sinfonia Ipsa
 Irish:
 Charles Villiers Stanford, Symphony No. 3 in F minor, Op. 28
 Arthur Sullivan: Symphony in E
 Iron and Steel: Sergei Prokofiev, Symphony No. 2 in D minor, Op. 40
 Italian/Italienne:
 Italian - Felix Mendelssohn, Symphony No. 4 in A major, Op. 90
 Italienne - Vincent d'Indy, Symphony No. 1 (never published)

J
 Janiculum: Vincent Persichetti, Symphony No. 9, Sinfonia Janiculum
 Jealousy: Leoš Janáček, discarded overture to Jenůfa
 Jena: Friedrich Witt, Jena Symphony
 Jeremiah:
 Leonard Bernstein, Symphony No. 1
 Bertold Hummel, Symphony No. 3, Op. 100
 Jeunehomme: Wolfgang Amadeus Mozart, Piano Concerto No. 9 in E-flat major, K. 271
 Joke: Joseph Haydn, String Quartet in E-flat major, Op. 33, No. 2
 Journey:
 The Journey - Einojuhani Rautavaara, Symphony No. 8
 Journey to Vega - Alan Hovhaness, Symphony No. 52, Op. 372
 Journey without Distance - Richard Danielpour, Symphony No. 3
 Jubilee: Malcolm Williamson, Symphony No. 4
 Jupiter: Wolfgang Amadeus Mozart, Symphony No. 41 in C major, K. 551

K
 Kaddish: Leonard Bernstein, Symphony No. 3
 Kayagum: Alan Hovhaness, Symphony No. 16, Op. 202
 Kegelstatt: Wolfgang Amadeus Mozart, Trio for Clarinet, Viola and Piano in E-flat major, K. 498
 Kinderstück: Felix Mendelssohn, Song without Words in A major, Op. 102/5
 Klagegesang: Karl Amadeus Hartmann, Symphony (1944), later reworked as part of Symphony No. 3
 Kleetüden: Jason Wright Wingate, Symphony No. 2, Kleetüden
 Korean: Krzysztof Penderecki, Symphony No. 5
 Kreutzer:
 Kreutzer - Ludwig van Beethoven, Violin Sonata No. 9 in A major, Op. 47
 Kreutzer Sonata - Leoš Janáček, String Quartet No. 1 (not named directly after Beethoven's composition, but after the novella The Kreutzer Sonata by Leo Tolstoy, which was in turn inspired by Beethoven)

L
 Lambach: attrib. Wolfgang Amadeus Mozart, Symphony in G major, K. Anh 221 (K. 45a) (c. 1766. Generally believed to be Leopold Mozart's work)
 Lament for the Son of Ossian: Charles Villiers Stanford, Irish Rhapsody for orchestra No. 2 in F minor, Op. 84
 Lamentatione: Joseph Haydn, Symphony No. 26 in D minor, Hob. I/26
 Lark: Joseph Haydn, Quartet No. 53 in D major, Op. 64, No. 5, FHE No. 35, Hoboken No. III:63
 Last: Franz Schubert, Symphony No. 10 in D major, D. 936a
 Latgalian: Jānis Ivanovs, Symphony No. 6
 Laudon: Joseph Haydn, Symphony No. 69 in C major, Hob. I/69
 La Madre De Los Gatos: Brian Beck
 Lebensstürme: Franz Schubert, Duo in A minor for piano 4-hands, D. 947
 Legendary: Eduard Tubin, Symphony No. 2
 Leningrad:
 Charles Camilleri, Piano Concerto No. 3 (1986)
 Dmitri Shostakovich, Symphony No. 7 in C major, Op. 60
 Letter V: Joseph Haydn, Symphony No. 88 in G major, Hob. I/88
 Das Lied von der Erde (The Song of the Earth): Gustav Mahler, Das Lied von der Erde (a symphony in the guise of a song cycle)
 Lieder der Vergänglichkeit (Songs of Transience): Krzysztof Penderecki, Symphony No. 8
 Linz: Wolfgang Amadeus Mozart, Symphony No. 36 in C major, K. 425
 Little C major: Franz Schubert, Symphony No. 6 in C major, D. 589
 Little G minor: Wolfgang Amadeus Mozart, Symphony No. 25 in G minor, K. 183/173 dB
 A Little Night Music: Wolfgang Amadeus Mozart, Serenade No. 13 in G major, Eine kleine Nachtmusik, K. 525
 Little Russian: Pyotr Ilyich Tchaikovsky, Symphony No. 2 in C minor, Op. 17
 Liturgical/Liturgique/Liturgy:
 Liturgical - Vincent Persichetti, Symphony No. 7
 Liturgique - Arthur Honegger, Symphony No. 3, H. 186
 Liturgy of Homage to the Australian Broadcasting Commission in its Fiftieth Year as University to the Australian Nation - Malcolm Williamson, Symphony No. 6
 Lobgesang (Hymn of Praise): Felix Mendelssohn (posthumously named Symphony No. 2 in B-flat major), Op. 52
 Lobkowitz: Joseph Haydn, String Quartets, Op. 77
 Lodi: Wolfgang Amadeus Mozart, String Quartet No. 1 in G major, K. 80/73f
 London:
 London - Joseph Haydn, Symphony No. 104 in D major, Hob. I/104
 A London Symphony - Ralph Vaughan Williams, Symphony No. 2
 Loon Lake: Alan Hovhaness, Symphony No. 63, Op. 411
 The Lord of the Rings: Johan de Meij, Symphony No. 1
 Los Angeles: Arvo Pärt, Symphony No. 4
 Low: Philip Glass, Symphony No. 1
 Lützow: Wolfgang Amadeus Mozart, Piano Concerto No. 8 in C major, K. 246
 Lyrical: Eduard Tubin, Symphony No. 4

M
 Madigan, Elvira: Wolfgang Amadeus Mozart, Piano Concerto No. 21 in C major, K. 467
 Majnun: Alan Hovhaness, Symphony No. 24, Op. 273
 Manfred: Pyotr Ilyich Tchaikovsky, Symphony No. 7 in B minor, Op. 58
 Maqam: Charles Camilleri, Piano Concerto No. 2 (1967–68)
 Maria Theresa: Joseph Haydn, Symphony No. 48 in C major, Hob. I/48
 Mathis der Maler: Paul Hindemith, Symphony: Mathis der Maler
 Le matin: Joseph Haydn, Symphony No. 6 in D major, Hob. I/6
 Mediterranean: Charles Camilleri, Piano Concerto No. 1 (1948, rev. 1978)
 Melancolía de tu recuerdo, Soria, En la: David del Puerto, Symphony No. 3
 Memoriam, In: see In Memoriam
 Mercury: Joseph Haydn, Symphony No. 43 in E-flat major, Hob. I/43
 Metal Orchestra: Alan Hovhaness, Symphony No. 17, Op. 203, Symphony for Metal Orchestra
 Metropolis: Michael Daugherty, Metropolis Symphony
 Le midi: Joseph Haydn, Symphony No. 7 in C major, Hob. I/7
 Midsummer Vigil: Hugo Alfven, Swedish Rhapsody No. 1 in D Major Op. 19
 Military:
 Frédéric Chopin, Polonaise in A major, Op. 40/1
 Joseph Haydn, Symphony No. 100 in G major, Hob. I/100
 Minute: Frédéric Chopin, Waltz No. 6 in D flat, Op. 64/1
 Miracle: Joseph Haydn, Symphony No. 96 in D major, Hob. I/96
 Miserae: Karl Amadeus Hartmann, Symphony No. 1 (later retitled simply 'Symphonic Poem')
 Missions of California: Meredith Willson, Symphony No. 2 in E minor
 Moonlight: Ludwig van Beethoven, Piano Sonata No. 14 in C-sharp minor, Op. 27
 Mount St. Helens: Alan Hovhaness, Symphony No. 50, Op. 360
 The Mountains of Brasil (Montanhas do Brasil): Heitor Villa-Lobos, Symphony No. 6
 Mountains and Rivers Without End: Alan Hovhaness, Chamber Symphony for 10 Players, Op. 225
 Mozartiana: Pyotr Ilyich Tchaikovsky, Orchestral Suite No. 4, Op. 61
 A Musical Joke: Wolfgang Amadeus Mozart, Divertimento for two horns and strings, K. 522
 Mysterious Mountain: Alan Hovhaness, Symphony No. 2, Op. 132

N
 Naïve: Franz Berwald, Symphony No. 4 in E-flat major
 Nanga Parvat: Alan Hovhaness, Symphony No. 7, Op. 178
 Naxos Quartets: Peter Maxwell Davies, a set of ten string quartets
 New England Holidays: Charles Ives, Holidays Symphony (A Symphony:  New England Holidays)
 New World: Antonín Dvořák, Symphony No. 9 in E minor, From the New World, Op. 95
 New York: Johan de Meij, Symphony No. 2, A New York Symphony
 Nomine Domini, In: Joseph Haydn, Symphony No. 84 in E-flat major, Hob. I/84
 Nordic: Howard Hanson, Symphony No. 1
 North, East, South, West: Henry Kimball Hadley, Symphony No. 4 in D minor, Op. 64
 Norwich: Edward German, Symphony No. 2 in A minor
 La notte: Antonio Vivaldi, Bassoon Concerto RV 501 (The Night)
 Die Nullte: Anton Bruckner, Symphony No. 0 in D minor
 Nusantara: David del Puerto, Symphony No. 2

O
 Ocean: Anton Rubinstein, Symphony No. 2 in C major, Op. 42
 Ocean Etude: Frédéric Chopin, Etude Op 25 #12
 To October: Dmitri Shostakovich, Symphony No. 2 in B major, Op. 14
 Ode to Silence: Anatol Vieru: Symphony No. 1
 Odense: attrib. Wolfgang Amadeus Mozart, Symphony in A minor, K. Anh 220 (K. 16a) (spurious)
 Odysseus: Alan Hovhaness, Symphony No. 25, Op. 275
 L'Œuvre: Karl Amadeus Hartmann, Symphony (1937–38), material later re-worked in Symphony No. 6
 Oh Let Man Not Forget These Words Divine: Alan Hovhaness, Symphony No. 62, Op. 402
 Oliver Cromwell: Rutland Boughton, Symphony No 1 (1904-5)
 Organ:
 Aaron Copland, Organ Symphony (his Symphony No. 1 is an arrangement of this symphony without the organ)
 Camille Saint-Saëns, Symphony No. 3 in C minor, Op. 78
 Overture in the Italian Style: Wolfgang Amadeus Mozart, Symphony No. 32 in G major, K. 318
 Oxford: Joseph Haydn, Symphony No. 92 in G major, Hob. I/92

P
 Paganini: Jivan Gurgeni Ter-T'at'evosian, Symphony No. 5
 Palindrome: Joseph Haydn, Symphony No. 47 in G major, Hob. I/47
 Paris: Wolfgang Amadeus Mozart, Symphony No. 31 in D major, K. 297/300a
 La passione: Joseph Haydn, Symphony No. 49 in F minor, Hob. I/49
 Pastoral:
 Ludwig van Beethoven, Piano Sonata No. 15 in D major, Op. 28
 Ludwig van Beethoven, Symphony No. 6 in F major, Op. 68
 Alexander Glazunov, Symphony No. 7 in F major, Op. 77
 Ralph Vaughan Williams, Symphony No. 3, A Pastoral Symphony
 La pastorella: Antonio Vivaldi, Recorder, oboe concerto RV 95/95a (The Little Shepherdess)
 Pathétique:
 Ludwig van Beethoven, Piano Sonata No. 8 in C minor, Op. 13
 Franz Liszt, Concerto pathétique for 2 pianos, S. 258
 Pyotr Ilyich Tchaikovsky, Symphony No. 6 in B minor, Op. 74
 Pauses: Anton Bruckner, Symphony No. 2 in C minor, Symphony of Pauses
 Peace:
 Peace, Symphony of (Sinfonia da Paz) - Cláudio Santoro, Symphony No. 4
 The Peace (A Paz) - Heitor Villa-Lobos, Symphony No. 5 (lost)
 Pesther Carneval: Franz Liszt, Hungarian Rhapsody No. 9, S. 244/9
 Philosopher: Joseph Haydn, Symphony No. 22 in E-flat major, Hob. I/22
 Pilgrim på Havet: Malcolm Williamson, Symphony No. 2
 Pilgrimage of a Little Soul: Leoš Janáček, Violin Concerto (unfinished)
 The Pioneers: Don Gillis, Symphony No. 6
 Les plaintes d'un troubadour: Franz Schubert, Moment musical No. 6 in A-flat major, D. 780/6
 Planet Earth: Johan de Meij, Symphony No. 3
 Pleiades M45: William T. Blows, Symphony No. 2
 Plutonian Ode: Philip Glass, Symphony No. 6
 The Poem of Ecstasy: Alexander Scriabin, symphonic poem The Poem of Ecstasy, Op. 54 (sometimes called "Symphony No. 4")
 Poétique: William T. Blows, Symphony No. 9
 Polish: Pyotr Ilyich Tchaikovsky, Symphony No. 3 in D major, Op. 29
 Polyphonic: Arvo Pärt, Symphony No. 1
 Pomes Penyeach: Michael Jeffrey Shapiro, Symphony No. 1
 Posthorn: Wolfgang Amadeus Mozart, Serenade No. 9 in D major, K. 320
 Prague:
 Dmitry Kabalevsky, Piano Concerto No. 4, Op. 99
 Wolfgang Amadeus Mozart, Symphony No. 38 in D major, K. 504
La primavera: Antonio Vivaldi, from Le quattro stagioni, Violin Concerto RV 269, Op. 8 L'estro armonico first concerto (from The Four Seasons: The Spring)
 Prussian:
 Joseph Haydn, String Quartets, Op. 50
 Wolfgang Amadeus Mozart, String Quartets No. 21-23, K. 575, 589, 590
 Psalms: Igor Stravinsky, Symphony of Psalms
 Pushkin: Boris Tishchenko, A Pushkin Symphony

Q
 Queen:
 Tolga Kashif, The Queen Symphony (based on the music of the pop group Queen)
 see also La Reine

R
 Raindrop: Frédéric Chopin, Prelude No. 15 in D flat major, Op. 28/15
 Rákóczi March: Franz Liszt, Hungarian Rhapsody No. 15, S. 244/15
 Rasumovsky: Ludwig van Beethoven, String Quartets Nos. 7 – 9, Op. 59
 Rebirth: Mieczysław Karłowicz,  Symphony in E minor, Op. 7
 Reformation: Felix Mendelssohn, Symphony No. 5 in D major/minor, Op. 107
 La Reine (The Queen): Joseph Haydn, Symphony No. 85 in B-flat major, Hob. I/85
 Reliquie: Franz Schubert, Piano Sonata No. 15 in C major, D. 840
 Requiem:
 Benjamin Britten, Sinfonia da Requiem
 Howard Hanson, Symphony No. 4
 Dmitry Kabalevsky, Symphony No. 3, Op. 22
 Resurrection: Gustav Mahler, Symphony No. 2 in C minor
 Reverenza: Bertold Hummel, Symphony No. 2
 Revolutionary: Frédéric Chopin, Etude in C minor, Op. 10/12
 Rhapsodic: William T. Blows, Symphony No. 8
 Rhenish: Robert Schumann, Symphony No. 3 in E-flat major, Op. 97
 Robusta: Boris Tishchenko, Sinfonia Robusta
 Roma: Georges Bizet, Roma Symphony
 Roman: Charles-Marie Widor,  Symphony for Organ No. 10
 Romantic/Romantica:
 Romantic - William T. Blows, Symphony No. 7
 Romantic - Anton Bruckner, Symphony No. 4 in E-flat major
 Romantic - Howard Hanson, Symphony No. 2 in D-flat major, Op. 30
 Romantica - Carlos Chávez, Symphony No. 4, Sinfonía romántica
 Roméo et Juliette: Hector Berlioz, Roméo et Juliette Symphony
 Rosamunde (Franz Schubert):
 String Quartet No. 13 in A minor, D. 804
 Impromptu No. 3 in B-flat major, D. 935/3
 Rotary: Karlheinz Stockhausen: Rotary Wind Quintet (the composer's third un-numbered wind quintet)
 La Roxelane: Joseph Haydn, Symphony No. 63 in C major, Hob. I/63
 Russian: Joseph Haydn, String Quartets, Op. 33
 Rustic/Rustica:
 Rustic - William T. Blows, Symphony No. 6
 Rustic Wedding - Karl Goldmark, Rustic Wedding Symphony (Ländliche Hochzeit, literally "Countryside Wedding")
 Rustica - Vagn Holmboe, Symphony No. 3, Sinfonia Rustica
 Alla rustica - Antonio Vivaldi Violin Concerto RV 151

S
 Sacra:
 Sinfonia Sacra - Howard Hanson, Symphony No. 5
 Sinfonia Sacra - Andrzej Panufnik, Symphony No. 3
 Sinfonia Sacra - Charles-Marie Widor, Sinfonia sacra for organ and orchestra
 Symphony Sacra - Alan Hovhaness, Symphony No. 58, Op. 389
 Sacrée: Charles Tournemire, Symphonie sacrée for organ
 Saga of the Prairie School: Don Gillis, Symphony No. 7
 St. Anne: Johann Sebastian Bach, Prelude and Fuge in E flat Major BWV 552 for Organ
 Saint Cecilia: George Frideric Handel, Concerto Grosso in D major, St Cecilia's Concerto, HWV 323
 Saint Vartan: Alan Hovhaness, Symphony No. 9, Op. 80/180
 San Francisco:
 San Francisco - Roy Harris, Symphony No. 8
 A Symphony of San Francisco -  Meredith Willson, Symphony No. 1 in F minor
 The Schoolmaster: Joseph Haydn, Symphony No. 55 in E-flat major, Hob. I/55
 Scottish: Felix Mendelssohn, Symphony No. 3 in A minor, Op. 56
 Sea:
 Howard Hanson, Symphony No. 7, A Sea Symphony
 Ralph Vaughan Williams, Symphony No. 1, A Sea Symphony
 Semplice (see also Simple):
 Carl Nielsen, Symphony No. 6, Sinfonia semplice
 Eduard Tubin, Symphony No. 9, Sinfonia semplice
 Serenata Notturna: Wolfgang Amadeus Mozart, Serenade No. 6 in D major, K. 239
 Serious (and variants):
 Serioso - Ludwig van Beethoven, String Quartet No. 11 in F minor, Op. 95
 Sérieuse - Franz Berwald, Symphony No. 1
 The Seven Gates of Jerusalem: Krzysztof Penderecki, Symphony No. 7
 Seven Stars: Charles Koechlin, Seven Stars Symphony
 Short: Aaron Copland, Symphony No. 2
 Der Sieg vom Helden Koburg: Wolfgang Amadeus Mozart, Contredanse in C, K. 587
 Siege Chronicles: Boris Tishchenko, The Siege Chronicles, a symphony for full orchestra
 Das Siegeslied: Havergal Brian, Symphony No. 4
 Silver Pilgrimage: Alan Hovhaness, Symphony No. 15, Op. 199
 Simple (see also Semplice):
 Benjamin Britten, Simple Symphony, Op. 4
 Sinfonia: see Symphony
 Singulière: Franz Berwald, Symphony No. 3
 Six-minute: John McCabe, Six-minute Symphony
 Slavic: Alexander Glazunov, Symphony No. 1 in E major, Op. 5
 Le soir: Joseph Haydn, Symphony No. 8 in G major, Hob. I/8
 The Song of the Earth: Gustav Mahler, Das Lied von der Erde (a symphony in the guise of a song cycle)
 Song of the Night: Gustav Mahler, Symphony No. 7
 Sorrowful Songs: Henryk Górecki, Symphony No. 3, Op. 36, Symphony of Sorrowful Songs
 Souvenir des Ming: Jeffrey Ching, Symphony No. 4, "Souvenir des Ming"
 Spinning Song: Felix Mendelssohn, Song without Words in A major, Op. 67/4
 Spring:
 Ludwig van Beethoven: Violin Sonata No. 5 in F major, Op. 24
 Benjamin Britten, Spring Symphony, Op. 44
 Wolfgang Amadeus Mozart, String Quartet No. 14 in G major, K. 387
 Robert Schumann, Symphony No. 1 in B-flat major, Op. 38
 Spring Song: Felix Mendelssohn, Song without Words in A major, Op. 62/6
 Star Dawn: Alan Hovhaness, Symphony No. 53, Op. 377
 Steppes of Central Asia, In the: Alexander Borodin, Musical Picture: In Central Asia
 Stonehenge: Paul W. Whear, Symphony No. 1
 Strings, Symphony for:
 Carlos Chávez, Symphony No. 5
 Vincent Persichetti, Symphony No. 5
 Malcolm Williamson, Symphony No. 7
 Study: Anton Bruckner, Study Symphony, aka Symphony No. 00
 Sud'ba cheloveka (The Fate of a Man): Jivan Gurgeni Ter-T'at'evosian, Symphony No. 2
 Sumé Pater Patrium, Amerindia: Heitor Villa-Lobos, Symphony No. 10
 Sun: Joseph Haydn, String Quartets, Op. 20
 Surprise: Joseph Haydn, Symphony No. 94 in G major, Hob. I/94
 Symphonia/Symphonie: see Symphony
 Symphony/ Symphonia/ Symphonie/ Sinfonia/ Symphonic:
 Antígona: Carlos Chávez, Symphony No. 1, Sinfonía de Antígona
 Antique: attrib. Friedrich Witt, Symphonie antique for organ and orchestra, with choral finale
 Antique: Charles-Marie Widor, Symphonie Antique for soloists, chorus, orchestra, and organ
 Antartica: Ralph Vaughan Williams, Symphony No. 7, Sinfonia antartica
 Boreale: Vagn Holmboe, Symphony No. 8, Sinfonia boreale
 Borealis: Arthur Butterworth, Symphony No. 3, Op. 52, Sinfonia Borealis
 Brasilia: Cláudio Santoro, Symphony No. 7, Sinfonia Brasilia
 Breve: Gösta Nystroem, Sinfonia breve
 Brevis:
 Havergal Brian, Symphony No. 22, Symphonia Brevis
 Vincent d'Indy, Symphony No. 3, Sinfonia brevis de bello Gallico
 Cévenole: Vincent d'Indy, Symphonie Cévenole (Cévennes Symphony), a.k.a. Symphonie sur un chant montagnard français (Symphony on a French Mountain Air)
 Children in the streets: Thomas Koppel, Symphony for Children in the streets (Symfoni for gadens børn)
 Comica: Felix Draeseke, Symphony No. 4, Symphonia Comica
 Concertante: Karl Amadeus Hartmann, Symphony No. 5, Symphonie concertante
 Cuerdas: Carlos Chávez, Symphony No. 5, Sinfonía para cuerdas
 Deux mondes: Pierre Kaelin, Symphonie des deux mondes (Symphony of the Two Worlds)
 Domestica: Richard Strauss,  Symphonia Domestica, Op. 53
 Energica: Jānis Ivanovs, Symphony No. 12, Sinfonia energica
 Espagnole: Édouard Lalo, Symphonie espagnole in D minor, Op. 21 (actually a violin concerto)
 Espansiva: Carl Nielsen, Symphony No. 3, Sinfonia Espansiva, Op. 27
 Faith: Don Gillis, Symphony No. 2, Symphony of Faith
 Fantasia: Hubert Parry, Symphony No. 5, Symphonic fantasia
 Fantastique: Hector Berlioz, Symphonie fantastique
 Free Men: Don Gillis, Symphony No. 3, A Symphony for Free Men
 French: Boris Tishchenko, A French Symphony
 French Mountain Air: Vincent d'Indy, Symphony on a French Mountain Air (Symphonie sur un chant montagnard français) a.k.a. Symphonie Cévenole ("Cévennes Symphony")
 Fun: Don Gillis, Symphony No. 5½, A Symphony for Fun
 Humana: Jānis Ivanovs, Symphony No. 13, Symphonia humana
 India: Carlos Chávez, Symphony No. 2, Sinfonía india
 Ipsa: Jānis Ivanovs, Symphony No. 15, Sinfonia Ipsa
 Janiculum: Vincent Persichetti, Symphony No. 9, Sinfonia Janiculum
 Metal Orchestra: Alan Hovhaness, Symphony No. 17, Op. 203, Symphony for Metal Orchestra
 Pauses: Anton Bruckner, Symphony No. 2 in C minor, Symphony of Pauses
 Peace: Cláudio Santoro, Symphony No. 4, Sinfonia da Paz (Symphony of Peace)
 Psalms: Igor Stravinsky, Symphony of Psalms
 Pushkin: Boris Tishchenko, A Pushkin Symphony
 Requiem: Benjamin Britten, Sinfonia da Requiem, Op. 20
 Robusta: Boris Tishchenko, Sinfonia Robusta
 Romantica: Carlos Chávez, Symphony No. 4, Sinfonía romántica
 Rustica: Vagn Holmboe, Symphony No. 3, Sinfonia rustica
 Sacra:
 Howard Hanson, Symphony No. 5, Sinfonia Sacra
 Alan Hovhaness, Symphony No. 58, Op. 389, Symphony Sacra
 Andrzej Panufnik, Symphony No. 3, Sinfonia Sacra
 Charles-Marie Widor, Sinfonia sacra for organ and orchestra
 Sacrée: Charles Tournemire, Symphonie sacrée for organ
 San Francisco: Meredith Willson, Symphony No. 1 in F minor, A Symphony of San Francisco
 Semplice:
 Carl Nielsen, Symphony No. 6, Sinfonia semplice
 Eduard Tubin, Symphony No. 9, Sinfonia semplice
 Sorrowful Songs: Henryk Górecki,  Symphony No. 3, Op. 36, Symphony of Sorrowful Songs
 Strings:
 Vincent Persichetti, Symphony No. 5, Symphony for Strings
 Malcolm Williamson, Symphony No. 7, Symphony for Strings
 Thousand: Gustav Mahler, Symphony No. 8 in E-flat major, Symphony of a Thousand
 Three Movements: Igor Stravinsky, Symphony in Three Movements
 Trabalho: Francisco Mignone, Sinfonia do Trabalho
 Tragica:
 Havergal Brian, Symphony No. 6, Sinfonia Tragica
 Felix Draeseke, Symphony No. 3, Symphonia Tragica
 Karl Amadeus Hartmann, later reworked as part of Symphony No. 3
 Transamazônica: Francisco Mignone, Sinfonia transamazônica
 Tropical: Francisco Mignone, Sinfonia tropical
 Two Worlds: Pierre Kaelin, Symphonie des deux mondes (Symphony of the Two Worlds)
 1933: Roy Harris, Symphony No. 1, Symphony 1933

T
 Tempest: Ludwig van Beethoven, Piano Sonata No. 17 in D minor, Op. 31/2
La tempesta di mare:
Antonio Vivaldi Violin concerto RV 253 (The Sea Tempest)
Antonio Vivaldi Flute concerto RV 443 (The Sea Tempest)
Antonio Vivaldi Flute, oboe, violin, bassoon concerto RV 98 and RV 570 (The Sea Tempest)
 Tempora mutantur: Joseph Haydn, Symphony No. 64 in A major, Hob. I/64
 Thousand: Gustav Mahler, Symphony No. 8 in E-flat major, Symphony of a Thousand
 Three Journeys to a Holy Mountain: Alan Hovhaness, Symphony No. 20, Op. 223
 Three Movements: Igor Stravinsky, Symphony in Three Movements
 Titan: Gustav Mahler, Symphony No. 1 in D major
 To the Appalachian Mountains: Alan Hovhaness, Symphony No. 60, Op. 396
 To the Green Mountains: Alan Hovhaness, Symphony No. 46, Op. 347
 To October: Dmitri Shostakovich, Symphony No. 2 in B major, Op. 14
 Toltec: Philip Glass, Symphony No. 7
 Tost: Joseph Haydn, String Quartets, Opp. 54, 55, 64
 Tragic/Tragica:
 Havergal Brian, Symphony No. 6, Sinfonia Tragica
 Frédéric Chopin, Polonaise No. 5 in F-sharp minor, Tragic
 Felix Draeseke, Symphony No. 3, Symphonia Tragica
 Gustav Mahler, Symphony No. 6 in A minor, Tragic
 Franz Schubert, Symphony No. 4 in C minor, D. 417, Tragic
 Trauer: Joseph Haydn, Symphony No. 44 in E minor, Hob. I/44
 Trauermarsch (Funeral March): Felix Mendelssohn, Song without Words in E minor, Op. 62/3
 Trout: Franz Schubert, Piano Quintet in A major, D. 667
 Turangalîla: Olivier Messiaen, Turangalîla-Symphonie
 Twickenham: Nikolai Kapustin, Piano Sonata No. 11, Op. 101 (2000)
 Two Worlds: Pierre Kaelin, Symphonie des deux mondes (Symphony of the Two Worlds)

U
 Unfinished: Franz Schubert, Symphony No. 8 in B minor, D. 759
 The Unforeseen (O Improvisto): Heitor Villa-Lobos, Symphony No. 1
 Universe: Charles Ives, Universe Symphony

V
 V, Letter: Joseph Haydn, Symphony No. 88 in G major, Hob. I/88
 Vahaken: Alan Hovhaness, Symphony No. 10, Op. 184
 Vartan, Saint: Alan Hovhaness, Symphony No. 9, Op. 80/180
 Venetian Boat Songs (Felix Mendelssohn):
 No. 1: Song without Words in G minor, Op. 19/6
 No. 2: Song without Words in F-sharp minor, Op. 30/6
 No. 3: Song without Words in A minor, Op. 62/5
 Veneziana, Alla: Arthur Butterworth, Trumpet Concerto, Op. 93, Alla Veneziana
 Versuch eines Requiem: Karl Amadeus Hartmann,  Symphony No. 1
 The Victory (A Vitória): Heitor Villa-Lobos, Symphony No. 4
 Vincentiana: Einojuhani Rautavaara, Symphony No. 6
 Vishnu: Alan Hovhaness, Symphony No. 19, Op. 217
 Vision of Andromeda: Alan Hovhaness, Symphony No. 48, Op. 355
 Voces intimae: Jean Sibelius, String Quartet, Op. 56
 Volkslied (Folksong): Felix Mendelssohn, Song without Words in A-flat major, Op. 53/5

W
 Wagner: Anton Bruckner, Symphony No. 3 in D minor, Wagner Symphony
 Waldstein: Ludwig van Beethoven, Piano Sonata No. 21 in C major, Op. 53
 Walla Walla, Land of Many Waters: Alan Hovhaness, Symphony No. 47, Op. 348
 Wanderer: Franz Schubert, Fantasy in C major, D. 760
 The Wandering of a Little Soul: Leoš Janáček, Violin Concerto (unfinished)
 The War (A Guerra): Heitor Villa-Lobos, Symphony No. 3
 Warsaw: Richard Addinsell, Warsaw Concerto
 White Mass: Alexander Scriabin, Piano Sonata No. 7, Op. 64
 Wine of Summer: Havergal Brian, Symphony No. 5
 Winter Daydreams: Pyotr Ilyich Tchaikovsky, Symphony No. 1 in G minor, Op. 13
 Winter Wind: Frédéric Chopin, Etude in A minor, Op. 25/11

Y
 The Year 1905: Dmitri Shostakovich, Symphony No. 11 in G minor, Op. 103
 The Year 1917: Dmitri Shostakovich, Symphony No. 12 in D minor, Op. 112
 Year of the Silent Sun: Anatol Vieru: Symphony No. 7
 Youth: Dmitry Kabalevsky, Piano Concerto No. 3 in D major, Op. 50
 Youth and Life: Henry Kimball Hadley, Symphony No. 1 in D minor, Op. 25

Z
 Zeitmaße: the first of Karlheinz Stockhausen's three unnumbered wind quintets

Numeric
 00: Anton Bruckner, Symphony No. 00, aka Study Symphony
 1812 Overture: Pyotr Ilyich Tchaikovsky
 1. X. 1905: Leoš Janáček, Piano Sonata (aka From the Street)
 The Year 1905: Dmitri Shostakovich, Symphony No. 11 in G minor, Op. 103
 The Year 1917: Dmitri Shostakovich, Symphony No. 12 in D minor, Op. 112
 1933: Roy Harris, Symphony No. 1, Symphony 1933

Nicknames in classical music
Classical music lists